Pedro José Figueroa Vizcaíno (born November 23, 1985) is a Dominican former professional baseball pitcher. He has played in Major League Baseball (MLB) for the Oakland Athletics and Texas Rangers.

Career

Oakland Athletics
Figueroa signed with Oakland in 2006 and split time between the Dominican Summer League Athletics 1 and the Arizona Rookie League Athletics.

For the 2007 and 2008 seasons, he played for the Vancouver Canadians, going 4–7 with a 4.07 ERA.

For the 2009 season, he split time between Kane County and Stockton.

For the 2010 season, Figueroa was ranked fifth in Oakland's farm system according to Baseball America. Despite not playing above Single-A, Oakland added him to their 40-man roster. He was recalled from Triple-A Sacramento after pitching a total of seven innings without allowing a run on April 21, 2012. He made his MLB debut later that day.

Figueroa was released by the Athletics on December 20, 2013.

Texas Rangers
On January 2, 2014 he was claimed off waivers by the Tampa Bay Rays. He was designated for assignment on January 23, 2014. He was claimed off waivers by the Texas Rangers on January 29, 2014. He was outrighted off the roster on October 6, 2014.

References

External links

1985 births
Living people
Arizona League Athletics players
Dominican Republic expatriate baseball players in Canada
Dominican Republic expatriate baseball players in the United States
Dominican Summer League Athletics players
Kane County Cougars players

Major League Baseball pitchers
Major League Baseball players from the Dominican Republic
Midland RockHounds players
Oakland Athletics players
Sacramento River Cats players
Stockton Ports players
Texas Rangers players
Tigres del Licey players
Vancouver Canadians players